Sergey Chudaev (born 12 August 1996, Kalininsk, Saratov Oblast) is a Russian political figure and a former deputy of the 8th State Duma. He graduated from the Plekhanov Russian University of Economics. Later Chudaev engaged in politics and soon became a member of the New People. In September 2021, he was elected deputy of the 8th State Duma; however, he resigned ahead of schedule on October 19, 2021, explaining this by the desire to focus on his work in Udmurtia. Politician Anton Tkachev took over his mandate.

References
 

 

1996 births
Living people
New People politicians
21st-century Russian politicians
Eighth convocation members of the State Duma (Russian Federation)
People from Saratov Oblast